Avantgarden S.r.l. (formerly Ovosonico S.r.l.) is an Italian video game developer based in Milan. It was founded in 2012 by industry veterans Massimo Guarini and Gianni Ricciardi, sold to Digital Bros in 2020.

History

Before the establishment of the studio, Guarini was the director for Grasshopper Manufacture's Shadows of the Damned and Ubisoft's Naruto: Rise of a Ninja. He also has production credits in games for the Splinter Cell and Rainbow Six franchises. After the release of Shadows of the Damned, Guarini decided to move from Japan back to his home country and go independent. He wanted to do something different in life after being in the video game industry for over fifteen years. His approach towards video games is more about trying to connect with humans, not just gamers.

Back to Italy, Guarini reunites with his former colleague Gianni Ricciardi, music composer and audio director for ubisoft and other developers. The two founded Ovosonico in 2012, in a villa on Lake Varese. In March 2013, Ovosonico announced a partnership with Sony Computer Entertainment Europe for the development of a new intellectual property, becoming the first Italian game studio to work with Sony. The game, Murasaki Baby, was announced at Sony's press conference during Gamescom 2013 for the PlayStation Vita. The game was released in North America and Europe in September 2014.

Digital Bros invested  in Ovosonico in September 2015, acquiring all Ricciardi's shares and gaining a 49% stake in the company, while Ricciardi left the company to found his own game audio production studio WANT Musik. In 2018, Guarini relocated Ovosonico to Milan. Digital Bros bought the remainder in March 2020. Guarini subsequently left the company and retained the Ovosonico brand under his company Guarini Design S.r.l., while the Ovosonico studio was rebranded Avantgarden with its twenty employees now managed by Digital Bros' Abramo "Rami" Galante.

Games developed
 Murasaki Baby (2014)
 Last Day of June (2017)

References

External links
 

Companies based in Milan
Italian companies established in 2012
Privately held companies of Italy
Video game companies established in 2012
Video game companies of Italy
Video game development companies
2020 mergers and acquisitions